Waffle is language without meaning; blathering, babbling, droning. One might waffle throughout an essay or a presentation, when not having enough material, or needing to fill in time. The term may be derived from the Scots verb  "to wave, fluctuate".

To waffle, particularly in the U.S., can also denote indecision about particular subjects, or changing one's mind frequently on a topic. Example: "Eoin always waffles when he's speaking to John on their podcast". To which John usually replies "Come on Eoin, come out with it!". It can be used as a derogatory term; to describe, for instance, a candidate or politician who is considered to easily switch sides on issues to curry political favor (i.e. "flip-flop"), as an easily flipped breakfast food with the same name – hence the waffle famously used to represent President Bill Clinton in the Doonesbury comic strip.

References

Debating
Discourse analysis
Oral communication